Carl Klingberg (born 28 January 1991) is a Swedish professional ice hockey forward for EV Zug of the National League (NL).

Early life
Klingberg was born on 28 January 1991 in Gothenburg, Sweden, and started playing ice hockey at an early age for Lerums BK. He has two younger brothers, both of whom are active hockey players as defencemen – John, who was drafted 131st overall in the 2010 NHL Entry Draft by the Dallas Stars, and Olle, who is playing with Lerums BK.

Playing career
Klingberg made his debut in Sweden's top-tier SHL for Frölunda HC during the 2008-09 season. He was drafted in the second round, 34th overall, by the Atlanta Thrashers in the 2009 NHL Entry Draft. After having finished the 2010-11 season with Timrå, Klingberg joined the Thrashers' American Hockey League (AHL) affiliate the Chicago Wolves. He made his AHL debut on 19 March in a 3–4 loss against the Oklahoma City Barons, and scored his first goal on 27 March in a 2–3 loss against the Rockford Icehogs. Klingberg was called up by the Thrashers to make his NHL debut in their last game of the season—and the franchise's last game as the Thrashers—on 10 April against the Pittsburgh Penguins.

In the off-season, the Thrashers were sold and relocated to Winnipeg, Manitoba, where they became the second incarnation of the Winnipeg Jets. Klingberg's goal was to start the season with the Jets in the NHL, but on 30 September he was assigned to the Jets' AHL affiliate the St. John's IceCaps. Klingberg scored a goal in the IceCaps 4–1 win in their premier game against the Providence Bruins. He scored the IceCaps first goal on home ice, and another two for a hattrick in the IceCaps 6–2 win against the Hamilton Bulldogs, and another two goals in a 4–3 win over the Bridgeport Sound Tigers a few days later to start the season with six goals in six games. After having scored nine goals and 16 points in 20 games Klingberg was called up to the Jets, where he played six games in the NHL before being reassigned back to the IceCaps after the Jets had acquired forward Antti Miettinen off waivers.

Klingberg scored his first NHL goal on 11 April 2014 against Karri Ramo of the Calgary Flames.

In the 2014–15 season, Klingberg could not solidify a roster spot with the Jets. On 1 March 2015, he was traded to the New York Rangers for forward Lee Stempniak. Klingberg was assigned to the Rangers' AHL affiliate, the Hartford Wolf Pack for the remainder of the season. He contributed offensively with 11 points in 13 games.

Without featuring for the Rangers, Klingberg, as an impending restricted free agent, signed a one-year contract with Russian-based Torpedo Nizhny Novgorod of the KHL on 21 June 2015. Following the 2015-16 season, he moved on to Switzerland, joining EV Zug of the National League A (NLA) on a one-year deal on 30 June 2016. On 8 October 2016, Klingberg was suspended for one game and fined CHF 1,230 for a hit to the head of EHC Kloten's Matthias Bieber. On 9 January 2017, Klingberg was once again suspended for one game by the SIHF and fined CHF 1,230 for a slew-footing on HC Ambrì-Piotta's Janne Pesonen. On 2 May 2017, Klingberg agreed to a two-year contract extension with the Bulls. On 21 May 2019, Klingberg was signed to a two-year contract extension by Zug. On 26 June 2021, Klingberg signed a new two-year deal to remain with Zug through the 2022/23 season.

International play

Klingberg was selected to play for Team Sweden at the 2018 Winter Olympics. He competed in one game and Sweden finished in 5th place.

Career statistics

Regular season and playoffs

International

References

External links

1991 births
Living people
Atlanta Thrashers draft picks
Atlanta Thrashers players
Borås HC players
Chicago Wolves players
Expatriate ice hockey players in Russia
Frölunda HC players
Hartford Wolf Pack players
Ice hockey players at the 2018 Winter Olympics
Ice hockey players at the 2022 Winter Olympics
Olympic ice hockey players of Sweden
Swedish ice hockey right wingers
Ice hockey people from Gothenburg
St. John's IceCaps players
Timrå IK players
Torpedo Nizhny Novgorod players
Winnipeg Jets players
EV Zug players